Carroll N. "Chick" Kirk was an American football player and college sports coach. He served as the head football coach (1909–1910) and head basketball coach (1909–1911) at Simpson College in Indianola, Iowa. Kirk was an outstanding college football player at the University of Iowa, earning All-Western honors in 1907. He is credited with being Iowa's first passing quarterback.

Head coaching record

Football

References

Year of birth missing
Year of death missing
American football halfbacks
American football quarterbacks
Iowa Hawkeyes football players
Simpson Storm football coaches
Simpson Storm men's basketball coaches